, a 1991 Japanese film written and directed by Mamoru Oshii and starring Shigeru Chiba and Yoshikatsu Fujiki. It is the second Kerberos saga film. It was preceded by The Red Spectacles, released in 1987. The film is a prequel to The Red Spectacles. It was followed by Jin-Roh in 1999.

Plot
The film begins with the last stand of the Kerberos unit. After disobeying an order to disarm and disband, they have held out for an unspecified time: talk between the fatigued Kerberos cops suggests that they might have been stuck there for three days, three months, to three years. A power amplifier system issues orders for a final stand and for Koichi Todome, Midori Washio, and Soichiro Toribe to come to the central building. A Kerberos named Inui wanders through the halls of the Kerberos headquarters and then witnesses officer Koichi Todome boarding a helicopter. Angry, Inui feels betrayed by his master and asks why he's running away and not fighting until the end like he has ordered to his men. As the helicopter takes off, the army breach the headquarters.

Three years later, Inui is released from prison and leaves Japan on parole. His contact from the mysterious Fugitive Support Group reported that Koichi Todome was exiled in Taipei, Taiwan. It is revealed later that Inui's release was engineered by the Public Security Division (公安部隊) and that his contact, Hayashi, is actually an agent of this intelligence service looking for Koichi who escaped once with the intention of creating a new Kerberos organization abroad and returning to Tokyo. Inui picks up on the trail of Koichi after finding Tang Mie, a teenage Taiwanese girl that Todome has been involved with. She tells Inui that Koichi also left her, and the two team up to search for the Panzer Cop officer. They find Koichi fishing prawns, and after a brawl, the trio settle down together.

However, the peace is soon broken. Hayashi contacts Inui to propose him a deal: either Koichi surrenders to be extradited and the Japanese government will be forgiving and allow the young man to remain in Taiwan with his beloved Tang Mie, or himself and Koichi will be hunted by the Public Security Force forever. In order to defeat the Public Security Force platoon, Inui needs Koichi's saved Protect-Gear and equipment. The two Kerberos fight together and Inui is the strongest. With his superior's suitcase in hand, Inui heads toward Hayashi's rendezvous point, an abandoned hotel. Inui confronts and captures the agent and orders him to help with the wearing of the Protect-Gear. Armed with Koichi's MG42 machinegun, Inui stalks the hotel and kills the Public Security Force squad. However, when killing the squad's leader in an abandoned Kerberos fortress, he is fatally wounded.

Soon after Inui has been murdered, Koichi is left alone in Taiwan, he grabs his now empty suitcase and returns to Tokyo. What happens to him in the capital as he seeks for the friends he once left there is narrated in The Red Spectacles.

Cast
Yoshikatsu Fujiki (藤木義勝) as Inui (乾)
Shigeru Chiba as Kōichi Todome (都々目紅一)
Sue Eaching (蘇意菁) as Tang Mie
Takashi Matsuyama (松山鷹志) as Hayashi aka "Man in White" (白服の男)

Audio
The OST Stray Dog Original Soundtrack is included as a bonus disc (DVD case) in the North American edition. As a comparison the bonus CD available in the Japanese release, Night Show, features the trilogy soundtrack, with 5 tracks per movie, plus 2 unreleased numbers from Akai Megane.

March 21, 1991 (Japan): StrayDog: Kerberos Panzer Cops [CD] (Apollon, BCCE-1)
11 tracks
February 25, 2003 (Japan): Mamoru Oshii Cinema Trilogy [4DVD+1CD+1BOOK] (Bandai Visual / Emotion, BCBJ-1519)
5 tracks
March 26, 2003 (Japan): Kenji Kawai Cinema Anthology [5CD] (King Record / Star Child, KICA-9601~4)
11 + 1 tracks
November 4, 2003 (U.S.): Mamoru Oshii Cinema Trilogy [3DVD+1CD] (Bandai Entertainment, 2430)
11 tracks
November 4, 2003 (Canada): Mamoru Oshii Cinema Trilogy [3DVD+1CD] (Bandai Entertainment, 2430)
11 tracks

Video
The LD "upgrade edition" includes a bonus disc featuring one hour of extra material including the documentary Dog Days. The latter was made available in the Dog Days After bonus disc available in the Japanese Mamoru Oshii Cinema Trilogy boxset. This boxset was released in North America without the extra, namely a 76 pages book and Dog Days After.

September 25, 1991 (Japan): Keruberosu: Jigoku no Banken [VHS] (Bandai Visual, BES-567)
December 19, 1991 (Japan): StrayDog: Kerberos Panzer Cops (upgrade edition) [2LD] (Bandai Visual / Emotion, BELL-475)
February 25, 2003 (Japan): Mamoru Oshii Cinema Trilogy [4DVD+1CD+1BOOK] (Bandai Visual / Emotion, BCBJ-1519)
November 4, 2003 (U.S.): Mamoru Oshii Cinema Trilogy [3DVD+1CD] (Bandai Entertainment, 2430)
November 4, 2003 (Canada): Mamoru Oshii Cinema Trilogy [3DVD+1CD] (Bandai Entertainment, 2430) English subtitled
November 4, 2003 (U.S.): StrayDog: Kerberos Panzer Cops [DVD] (Bandai Entertainment, 2432B) English subtitled

Awards
Officially invited to the Japanese Yubari International Fantastic Film Festival in February 1991.

Notes

External links
 
 Kerberos saga official website 
 Protect-Gear producer Buildup's official product page 

1991 films
Japanese science fiction action films
1990s science fiction action films
1991 action thriller films
Kerberos saga
Films directed by Mamoru Oshii
Shochiku films
Films scored by Kenji Kawai
1990s Japanese films